Ödön Földessy (1 July 1929 – 9 June 2020) was a Hungarian athlete who mainly competed in the long jump. He was born in Békés. He competed for Hungary in the men's long jump event at the 1952 Summer Olympics held in Helsinki, Finland, where he won the bronze medal.

He died in Budapest on 9 June 2020.

References

External links

Ödön Földessy's profile at Sports Reference.com

1929 births
2020 deaths
Hungarian male long jumpers
Olympic bronze medalists for Hungary
Athletes (track and field) at the 1952 Summer Olympics
Athletes (track and field) at the 1956 Summer Olympics
Olympic athletes of Hungary
European Athletics Championships medalists
Medalists at the 1952 Summer Olympics
Olympic bronze medalists in athletics (track and field)
People from Békés
Sportspeople from Békés County